RAF Oban is a former Royal Air Force (RAF) flying boat base located at the northern end of the island of Kerrera, in Ardantrive Bay west of Oban, Argyll and Bute, Scotland during the Second World War.

History
Oban was surveyed by the RAF in the 1930s as a suitable base for flying boat operations. A fuel depot was set up on the island of Kerrera while No. 209 Squadron RAF began utilising the facilities operating the Supermarine Stranraer flying-boat in October 1939. An aircraft servicing area, new slip and jetty were constructed on the island.

The base became operational in September 1938, with headquarters at Dungallan House, Oban. No. 209 Squadron re-equipped with Saro Lerwick flying-boats were based at RAF Oban. Aircrew based at RAF Oban were billeted in the main seafront hotels at Oban. No. 210 Squadron RAF equipped with the Short Sunderland replaced No. 209 Squadron in July 1940.

Anti submarine patrols, convoy escorts as part of 18 Group Coastal Command and ferry services were carried out from the base. No. 228 Squadron RAF, No. 10 Squadron Royal Australian Air Force, No. 422 and 423 Squadrons Royal Canadian Air Force, No. 330 (Norwegian) Squadron RAF.

No. 302 Ferry Training Unit RAF (July 1943 – April 1945) and No. 4 Flying Boat Servicing Unit RAF (September 1942 – 1945) served at the base.

A Flying Boat Maintenance Unit located to the north east at Ganavan provided maintenance for aircraft utilising the base. The base was reverted to care and maintenance on 28 April 1945.

Commanding officers
Group Captain J.H.O. Jones – September 1938.
Group Captain J H Chaplin – December 1943.

References

Citations

Bibliography

External links

RAF Oban Information
Secret Scotland

Oban
Airports established in 1938
Royal Air Force stations of World War II in the United Kingdom
RAF